Edmund Arrowsmith, SJ (c. 1585 – 28 August 1628) was one of the Forty Martyrs of England and Wales of the Catholic Church. The main source of information on Arrowsmith is a contemporary account written by an eyewitness and published a short time after his death. This document, conforming to the ancient style of the "Acts of martyrs" includes the story of the execution of another 17th-century recusant martyr, Richard Herst.

Life
Bryan Arrowsmith was born at Haydock, Lancashire, England, in 1585, the eldest child of Robert Arrowsmith, a yeoman farmer, who had served in Sir William Stanley's regiment which fought for Spain in the Low Countries. His mother was Margery Gerard, a member of the Lancashire Gerard family. Among his mother's relations was the priest John Gerard, who wrote The Diary of an Elizabethan Priest, as well as another martyr, Miles Gerard. He was baptised Brian, but always used his confirmation name of Edmund, after an uncle who trained English priests in France. The family was constantly harassed for its adherence to Roman Catholicism. One of his grandfathers died a confessor in prison. On one occasion, as a child, he was left shivering in his night-clothes by the pursuivants, who carried his parents off to Lancaster jail; he and his three siblings were cared for by neighbours.

Education
In 1605, at the age of twenty, Arrowsmith left England and went to the English College, Douai, to study for the priesthood.  He was soon forced to return to England due to ill health, but recovered and returned to Douai in 1607.

Ecclesiastical career
He was ordained in Arras on 9 December 1612, and sent on the English mission a year later. He ministered to the Catholics of Lancashire without incident until around 1622, when he was arrested and questioned by the Anglican Bishop of Chester. Arrowsmith was released when King James I of England ordered an amnesty for all arrested priests, in furtherance of negotiations to arrange a Spanish marriage for his son Prince Charles. Arrowsmith joined the Jesuits in 1624.

In the summer of 1628, Arrowsmith was reportedly betrayed by a man named Holden, who denounced him to the authorities. Arrowsmith ministered to Catholics of Lancashire at the still-standing Arrowsmith House, located in Gregson Lane before being arrested and questioned on Brindle Moss where his horse refused to jump a ditch. He was convicted of being a Roman Catholic priest in England. He was sentenced to death, and hanged, drawn and quartered at Lancaster on 28 August 1628. His final confession was heard by John Southworth, who was imprisoned along with Arrowsmith.

Veneration
Edmund Arrowsmith's was beatified in 1929. In 1970, he was canonized as one of the Forty Martyrs of England and Wales by Pope Paul VI  His feast day is 28 August, he is also commemorized on 25 October with the Forty Martyrs. 
Lancaster Cathedral celebrates Arrowsmith as one of the Lancashire Martyrs, whose feast is kept throughout the diocese on 7 August each year.

His hand was preserved and kept by the Arrowsmith family as a relic and it now rests in the Catholic Church of St Oswald and St Edmund Arrowsmith, Ashton-in-Makerfield. Stonyhurst College retains the small trunk of vestments and equipment which he carried from house to house.

St Edmund Arrowsmith Catholic High School is located in Ashton-in-Makerfield, Greater Manchester, England. There is also St Edmund Arrowsmith Catholic Academy in Whiston, Merseyside.

References

External links
Gardner, Mick. "The Death of Saint Edmund Arrowsmith", Brindle Historical Society

Jesuit saints
1585 births
1628 deaths
People from St Helens, Merseyside
Martyred Roman Catholic priests
English Roman Catholic saints
Forty Martyrs of England and Wales
People executed by Stuart England by hanging, drawing and quartering
People from Haydock
17th-century Christian saints
Canonizations by Pope Paul VI
17th-century Roman Catholic martyrs
17th-century English Roman Catholic priests
Jesuit martyrs
Executed people from Merseyside
Executed Roman Catholic priests